Hunter Street can refer to:

Hunter Street (Hamilton, Ontario)
Hunter Street, Newcastle
Hunter Street, Sydney
Hunter Street (TV series), Dutch series airing on Nickelodeon